Darker Circles is a 2010 album by Canadian alt-country group The Sadies. It was released on April 27, 2010, on Yep Roc Records.

The album was a shortlisted nominee for the 2010 Polaris Music Prize.

"Darker Circles" won the top prize in Exclaim! Magazine's 2010 Folk & Country Year in Review. The album was praised for its richly detailed storytelling, "staying on top of the Sadies' progress over the past decade has been a wild ride. Aside from an endless string of collaborations, each album has edged closer to psychedelic country-rock perfection. The biggest obstacle has always been raising their songwriting game to the same level as their instrumental prowess, and that has finally been accomplished on Darker Circles."

Track listing 
All tracks written by The Sadies except where noted.

 "Another Year Again" – 3:18
 "Cut Corners" – 3:20
 "Another Day Again" – 2:06
 "Tell Her What I Said" – 4:53
 "The Quiet One" – 3:26
 "Postcards" – 2:41
 "Whispering Circles" – 3:12
 "Idle Tomorrows" (Gary Louris, The Sadies)– 3:28
 "Choosing To Fly" – 2:16
 "Violet and Jeffrey Lee" – 3:13
 "10 More Songs" – 4:14

References

External links 

2010 albums
The Sadies albums
Yep Roc Records albums